Keemat is a 1973 Indian Hindi-language spy thriller film directed by Ravikant Nagaich. It has music by Laxmikant-Pyarelal and lyrics by Anand Bakshi. The film stars Dharmendra, Rekha in lead roles, along with Prem Chopra, Ranjeet, Agha, Satyendra Kapoor and Murad. The character of Gopal Kishan Pandey (Agent 116) was also used for movie Farz and Raksha. The film was remade in Telugu as Andadu Aagadu (1979).

Cast 
 Dharmendra as Gopal Kishan Pandey / Agent 116
 Rekha as Sudha
 Prem Chopra as Shaktimaan
 Ranjeet as Pedro
 Padma Khanna as Nanda / Maria
 Jayshree T. as Nagina
 Agha as Constable Pandurang
 Satyendra Kapoor as Inspector Deshpande
 Murad as Police Commissioner
 K. N. Singh as Secret Service Chief

Soundtrack

References

External links 
 

1973 films
1970s Hindi-language films
1970s spy thriller films
1970s spy action films
Films scored by Laxmikant–Pyarelal
Hindi films remade in other languages
Indian spy thriller films
Indian detective films
Indian spy action films
Films directed by Ravikant Nagaich